Jessica Paola Román Frutos (born 8 July 1993) is a Paraguayan footballer who plays as a forward for Chilean club CD Arturo Fernández Vial and the Paraguay women's national team.

International career
Román made her senior debut for Paraguay on 7 November 2019, in a 1–2 home friendly loss to Argentina.

References

1993 births
Living people
Paraguayan women's footballers
Women's association football forwards
Deportivo Capiatá players
Paraguay women's international footballers
Paraguayan expatriate women's footballers
Paraguayan expatriate sportspeople in Chile
Expatriate women's footballers in Chile
20th-century Paraguayan women
21st-century Paraguayan women